Head shaving is a form of body modification which involves shaving the hair from a person's head. People throughout history have shaved all or part of their heads for diverse reasons including aesthetics, convenience, culture, fashion, practicality, punishment, a rite of passage, religion, or style.

Early history
The earliest historical records describing head shaving are from ancient Mediterranean cultures such as Egypt, Greece, and Rome. The Egyptian priest class ritualistically removed all hair from head to toe by plucking it.

As a symbol of subordination

Enslaved peoples

In many cultures throughout history, cutting or shaving the hair on men has been seen as a sign of subordination. In ancient Greece and much of Babylon, long hair was a symbol of economic and social power, while a shaved head was the sign of a slave. This was a way of the slave-owner establishing the slave's body as their property by literally removing a part of their personhood and individuality.

Military
The practice of shaving heads has been widely used in the military. Although sometimes explained as being for hygiene reasons, the image of strict and disciplined conformity is also accepted as a factor. Upon the Allied invasion of Normandy during World War II, many soldiers chose to have their heads completely shaved in order to deny any Nazis the opportunity to grab it if they engaged in hand-to-hand combat. For the new military recruit, it can be a rite of passage, and variations of it have become a badge of honor.

Prison and punishment
Prisoners commonly have their heads shaven to prevent the spread of lice, but it may also be used as a demeaning measure. Having the head shaved can be a punishment prescribed in law. Nazis punished people accused of racial mixing by parading them through the streets with shaved heads and placards around their necks detailing their "crimes".

During and after World War II, thousands of French women had their heads shaved in front of cheering crowds as punishment for either collaborating with the Nazis or having sexual relationships with Nazi soldiers during the war. Some Finnish women also had their heads shaved for allegedly having relationships with Soviet prisoners of war during the war.

Religious significance

Many Buddhists and Vaisnavas, especially Hare Krishnas, shave their heads. Some Hindu and most Buddhist monks and nuns shave their heads upon entering their order, and Buddhist monks and nuns in Korea have their heads shaved every 15 days. Muslim men have the choice of shaving their heads after performing the Umrah and Hajj, following the tradition of committing to Allah, but are not required to keep it permanently shaved.

Hasidic Jewish men will occasionally shave all of their head except for the sides to emphasize their payot (sidelocks). In certain Hasidic sects, most famously Satmar, married women shave their heads every month before immersion in the mikveh (ritual bath).

Practicality

Sport

Competitive swimmers, sprinters, and joggers sometimes seek to gain an advantage by completely removing all hair from their entire body to reduce drag while competing.

Baldness
People experiencing hair loss may shave their heads in order to look more presentable, for convenience, or to adhere to a certain style or fashion movement. Those with alopecia areata or androgenetic alopecia often choose to shave, which has rapidly become a common choice since the 1990s. It has also become more common for bald men to accessorize with small hoop or stud earrings, a look famously adopted by figures such as basketball player Michael Jordan and professional wrestler "Stone Cold" Steve Austin upon shaving their heads in the 1990s.

Notable people

Real
This list includes only notable people for whom a shaved head is an important and recognizable part of their public image; it is not a list of every celebrity who has shaved their head at some point in their life.

Andre Agassi, American tennis player
Kurt Angle, American professional wrestler and Olympian
"Stone Cold" Steve Austin, American professional wrestler
Charles Barkley, American basketball player
David Bateson, English actor
Jeff Bezos, American entrepreneur
Kobe Bryant, American basketball player
Yul Brynner, Russian-American actor
Bill Burr, American comedian
Dave Chappelle, American comedian
Michael Chiklis, American actor
Phil Collins, English musician
Common, American rapper
Billy Corgan, American musician
Terry Crews, American actor
Chris Daughtry, American musician
Vin Diesel, American actor
Taye Diggs, American actor
Domenico Dolce, Italian fashion designer
George Foreman, American boxer
Tyson Fury, English boxer
Peter Gabriel, English musician
Tyrese Gibson, American actor
Bill Goldberg, American professional wrestler and former football player.
Pep Guardiola, Spanish soccer manager
Rob Halford, English musician
Phil Heath, American bodybuilder
Evander Holyfield, American boxer
LL Cool J, American rapper and actor
Samuel L. Jackson, American actor
Dwayne Johnson, American actor and professional wrestler
Magic Johnson, American basketball player
Michael Jordan, American basketball player
Keegan-Michael Key, American comedian
Ben Kingsley, English actor
Anton LaVey, American author and Satanic Church founder
Kyle Macy, American basketball commentator
John Malkovich, American actor
Floyd Mayweather, American boxer
Moby, American musician
Dean Norris, American actor
Shaquille O'Neal, American basketball player
Pitbull, American rapper
Ving Rhames, American actor
Flo Rida, American rapper
Joe Rogan, podcast host
Rick Ross, American rapper
Telly Savalas, American actor
Tupac Shakur, American rapper
Brian Shaw, American strongman
Big Show, American professional wrestler
Johnny Sins, American pornographic actor
Chris Slade, Welsh drummer known for his tenure in the rock band AC/DC.
Kelly Slater, American surfer
Jason Statham, English actor
Patrick Stewart, English actor
Michael Stipe, American musician
Corey Stoll, American actor
Mark Strong, English actor
Stanley Tucci, American actor
Matthew West, American Cop and Relationship Expert
Dana White, American entrepreneur and UFC president
Bruce Willis, American actor
Zinedine Zidane, French soccer player

Fictional
In modern fiction, shaved heads are often associated with characters who display a stern and disciplined or hardcore attitude. Examples include characters played by Yul Brynner, Vin Diesel, Samuel L. Jackson, Telly Savalas, Sigourney Weaver, and Bruce Willis, as well as characters such as Agent 47 (whose physical appearance was based on his actor, the aforementioned David Bateson), Mr. Clean, Kratos, Saitama, and Walter White. Baldness is sometimes an important part of these characters' biographies; for example, Saitama wanted to be a superhero and lost all of his hair in exchange for receiving superpowers. Shaved heads are also often associated with villains in fiction, such as Ernst Stavro Blofeld, Colonel Kurtz, Lex Luthor, and Alex Macqueen's version of the Master. A notable exception is Daddy Warbucks.

A goatee, usually of the Van Dyke variety, is often worn to complement the look or add sophistication; this look was widely popularized in the mid-to-late 1990s by professional wrestler "Stone Cold" Steve Austin. For the majority of the crime drama series Breaking Bad, often regarded as one of the greatest TV series of all time, the aforementioned Walter White (played by Bryan Cranston) wore a Van Dyke with a shaved head, contributing to the character's iconic status.

In futuristic settings, shaved heads are often associated with bland uniformity, especially in sterile settings such as  V for Vendetta and THX 1138. In the 1927 sci-fi film Metropolis, hundreds of extras had their heads shaved to represent the oppressed masses of a future dystopia.

It is less common for female characters to have shaved heads, though some actresses have shaved their heads or used bald caps for roles.

Modern subcultures

Skinheads
In the 1960s, some British working-class youths developed the skinhead subculture, whose members were distinguished by short cropped hair (although they did not shave their heads down to the scalp at the time). This look was partly influenced by the Jamaican rude boy style. It was not until the skinhead revival in the late 1970s—with the appearance of punk-influenced Oi! skinheads—that many skinheads started shaving their hair right down to the scalp. Head shaving has also appeared in other youth-oriented subcultures such as the hardcore, black metal, metalcore, nu metal, hip hop, techno, and neo-nazi scenes.

Sexuality and gender
A sexual fetish involving head shaving is called trichophilia. While a shaved head on a man is often seen as a sign of authority and virility, a shaved head on a woman typically connotes androgyny, especially when combined with traditionally feminine signifiers. It may, but does not always, express membership in the LGBT community; gay men sometimes incorporate a shaven head into their overall look, particularly amongst the bear subculture. Those with the stereotypical "Castro clone" look commonly shave their heads in order to project a homoerotic, ultra-masculine image. Drag queens have sometimes adopted shaved heads to express a genderqueer image. In the BDSM community, shaving a submissive or slave's head is often used to demonstrate powerlessness or submission to the will of a dominant.

Fundraising and support

Cancer

Baldness is perhaps the most famous side effect of the chemotherapy treatment for cancer, and some people shave their heads before undergoing such treatment or after the hair loss starts to become apparent; some people chose to shave their heads in solidarity with cancer sufferers, especially as part of a fundraising effort.

Covhead-19 Challenge
During the early days of the COVID-19 pandemic in 2020, many countries imposed strict lockdown procedures and actively encouraged members of the public to self-isolate. Many people, particularly men, initially began to shave their heads during lockdown due to boredom and being unable to have their hair cut as barbershops were forced to stay closed. In the UK, a fundraising effort began to support its National Health Service, which suffered from the enormous pressure of the pandemic. The effort was started on Just Giving with a goal of £100,000; it encouraged people to shave their heads whilst also donating money to the NHS and was dubbed the "Covhead-19 Challenge". Various celebrities also took part.

See also

 Barber
 Baldness
 Bob cut
 Buzz cut
 Depilation
 Hair
 Hairstyle
 Hair removal
 List of hairstyles
 Mohawk hairstyle
 Razor
 Shaving
 Skullet
 Social role of hair
 Tonsure

References

 	

Shaving
Human hair
Hairstyles